The James William Beekman House (also known as "The Cliffs") is a historic house located on West Shore Road in Oyster Bay, Nassau County, New York.

Description and history 
It was designed by noted English architect Henry G. Harrison in 1863 and built for New York Hospital vice-president James William Beekman (1815-1877). It is a two-story, rectangular wood-framed dwelling with a steeply sloped, cross-gabled roof designed in the Gothic Revival style. It features hipped roof dormers, a relatively simple one story verandah, and is situated on a flat plateau atop a rocky outcropping. Also on the property are a superintendent's cottage, stable, carriage house, brick greenhouse, potting house, and the Spring Lake archaeological site.

It was listed on the National Register of Historic Places on December 12, 1973.

References

External links
The Cliffs (Old Long Island)

Houses on the National Register of Historic Places in New York (state)
Gothic Revival architecture in New York (state)
Houses completed in 1864
Houses in Nassau County, New York
National Register of Historic Places in Oyster Bay (town), New York
1864 establishments in New York (state)
Beekman family